Raphael Rodrigues (16 May 1894 – 30 November 1981) was a Brazilian footballer. He played in four matches for the Brazil national football team in 1922. He was also part of Brazil's squad for the 1922 South American Championship.

References

External links
 

1894 births
1981 deaths
Brazilian footballers
Brazil international footballers
Footballers from São Paulo
Association football forwards
Sport Club Corinthians Paulista players